Yuleidis Limonta Ramírez (born March 14, 1982) is a female heptathlete from Cuba.

Competition record

References

Profile

1982 births
Living people
Cuban heptathletes
Athletes (track and field) at the 2003 Pan American Games
Pan American Games competitors for Cuba
Central American and Caribbean Games gold medalists for Cuba
Competitors at the 2006 Central American and Caribbean Games
Central American and Caribbean Games medalists in athletics